Howard White may refer to:
 Howard White (American football), American football coach
 Howard White (writer) (born 1945), Canadian writer
 Howard D. White (born 1936), American librarian
 Howard White (footballer) (born 1954), footballer for Manchester City
 Howard A. White (1913–1991), American historian and academic administrator